The Pfister Hotel is a luxury hotel in downtown Milwaukee, Wisconsin, United States. The Pfister Hotel is a member of Historic Hotels of America, the official program of the National Trust for Historic Preservation.

Owned by Guido Pfister and his son, Charles F. Pfister, it was opened in 1893 at a cost of over $1 million. Designed by architect Henry C. Koch in Romanesque Revival style, it had features uncommon in its time like fireproofing, electricity, and thermostat controls.

The hotel was purchased by hospitality magnate Ben Marcus in 1962, who renovated the hotel and added a 13-story addition behind the building without compromising the original building itself, and continues to be owned by the Marcus Corporation. The Pfister Hotel has the largest hotel collection of Victorian art in the world. The hotel has held the AAA Four Diamond award for 37 years, since the inception of the ranking itself in 1977.

It is listed on the National Register of Historic Places as part of the East Side Commercial Historic District.

The 1986 National Register nomination states:The Pfister is the last nineteenth century grand hotel remaining in downtown Milwaukee. Local materials were used in its construction with rock-faced, Wauwatosa limestone for the first two floors and cream brick for the third through eighth floors. Indiana limestone and terra cotta were used as trim. Changes to the exterior include the removal of the massive stone portico on the Jefferson Street facade and the closing of an entrance at the southeast corner. The main lobby has been refurbished and restored to resemble its original appearance."

See also
 List of Historic Hotels of America

References

Skyscraper hotels in Milwaukee
Historic Hotels of America